Jorge Castellón Velarde (born 7 February 1969) is a former Bolivian sprinter who competed in the men's 100m competition at the 1996 Summer Olympics. He recorded a 10.74, not enough to qualify for the next round past the heats. His personal best is 10.65, set in 1996.

References

1969 births
Bolivian male sprinters
Athletes (track and field) at the 1996 Summer Olympics
Olympic athletes of Bolivia
Living people